The following is the family tree of the Malay monarchs of Kelantan. While foreign sources include oblique references to the successive rulers who governed the city states of ancient Kelantan, a clear genealogy only emerges with Mansur Shah who reigned from 1465 to 1526. His father, Iskandar Shah is said to have been descendant of the ruler of the similarly obscure Kota Gelanggi.

House of Iskandar
References to Kelantan in the Malay Annals allude to a well-established sultanate in the 15th century with its power rivalling that of neighbouring Patani. It identifies Kelantan's line of rulers as descending from Raja Chulan, the ruler of Kota Gelanggi. Towards the end of the 15th century, during the reign of Sultan Mansur, Kelantan was conquered by Melaka, but he was restored to the throne shortly afterwards as Kelantan became the vassal of Melaka until 1511. A prince of Melaka dynasty from Johor, Raja Hussin ruled the Sultanate from 1580 to 1610 in the place of the younger Siti Wan Kembang, the daughter of Sultan Ahmad, who would become the legendary female ruler of the Sultanate.

Siti Wan Kembang's rule coincided with the emergence of a small Jembal Sultanate in northeastern modern Kelantan. She later adopted the daughter of Raja Loyor, Jembal's second ruler. The subsequent abdication of Siti Wan Kembang in favour of this adopted child known as Puteri Saadong, who also inherited the throne of Jembal marked the union of the kingdoms of Kelantan and Jembal. Siti Wan Kembang was the last member of the line of rulers descended from Sultan Iskandar Shah.

 – Rulers of Kelantan

House of Jembal

House of Long Yunus
Details on the origin of the House of Long Yunus is obscure, except that its progenitor, Wan Daim, was identified as a nobleman from Pattani, who had close relationship with Sultan Umar of Jembal. There are different accounts on the lineage of Wan Daim in various texts. According to Ringkasan Cetera Kelantan edited by Nik Mahmud, Wan Daim is thought to have descended from Andi or Andik Ali, a Bugis prince who migrated from Johor to Pattani in 1640. However, this view was refuted by the members of Kelantan Royal family. Another popular account came from Hikayat Seri Kelantan, that identified Wan Daim as a renegade Cham prince. While in a genealogy known as Salsilah Shaikh Safiuddin, Wan Daim is said to have descended from Shaikh Safiuddin, a nobleman of Pattani.

Following the power struggle which resulted in the murder of his father Long Sulaiman in 1756, Long Yunus fled to the neighboring Terengganu Sultanate, placing himself under the protection of its powerful ruler, Mansur Shah I. In 1764, Sultan Mansur launched first of a series of attack against Kelantan, successfully brought his protege Long Yunus to the throne of Kelantan 11 years later. Until the end of the 18th century, Kelantan remained under the overlordship of Terengganu. In spite of this, Long Yunus is regarded as the founder of the modern state of Kelantan, as he was credited for unifying the state and successfully brought all the warring chiefs under his control.

References

Bibliography
 
 
 
 
 

Kelantan